Leif Hveem known as Basse Hveem (1920-1964) was an international speedway rider from Norway.

Speedway career 
Hveem won the gold medal at the European Longtrack Champion in the 1957 Individual Long Track European Championship.

In 1953, he won the second Continental Speedway Final. 

He was champion of Norway seven times in 1940, 1947, 1948, 1949, 1951, 1952 and 1953. He was also the Norwegian Longtrack Champion in 1947, 1948, 1949, 1951, 1953, 1955, 1956, 1957 and the Scandinavian Longtrack Champion in 1946, 1947, 1948, 1949, 1950, 1951, 1956, 1957.

He rode a few meetings in the top tier of British Speedway in 1953, riding for West Ham Hammers.

References 

1920 births
1964 deaths
Norwegian speedway riders
West Ham Hammers riders
Sportspeople from Oslo